The Prince Mohammed Stadium is a multi-use stadium in Zarqa, Jordan. It is currently used mostly for football matches. The stadium holds 11,400 people after the installation of seats.

References

External links
Venue information

Football venues in Jordan
Zarqa